Gary Joseph Knipfing (born November 22, 1961), better known by his stage name Gary Valentine, is an American actor and comedian. He is the older brother of actor Kevin James. He starred as Danny Heffernan in The King of Queens (1998–2007) as Kevin James' (Doug Heffernan's) cousin, as Kyle Gable in Kevin Can Wait (2016-2018), and has appeared in numerous Happy Madison Productions.

Early life

Valentine was born Gary Joseph Knipfing in Mineola, New York, to Janet, who worked in a chiropractor's office, and Joseph Valentine Knipfing, Jr., who owned an insurance agency. His family is of German and Greek descent. Valentine has two siblings: Kevin George Knipfing, known as Kevin James, an actor and comedian, and Leslie Knipfing. Gary and his siblings were raised in the Catholic faith.

Career

Valentine got his start in show business on the standup comedy stage. After an appearance at the Montreal Comedy Festival, he left his native New York for Los Angeles. There he quickly landed spots on various talk shows, including The Late Late Show with Craig Kilborn, Late Night with Conan O'Brien, and The Tonight Show with Jay Leno. He has been headlining comedy clubs and theaters for the past fifteen years.

He is best known for his role as Danny Heffernan on The King of Queens, playing the cousin of principal character Doug Heffernan (performed by his real-life brother Kevin James) for nine seasons. 
Valentine appeared on the television show Men of a Certain Age, which was written and directed by Ray Romano and met with critical acclaim. Prior to his run on the series, he starred in his own half-hour special on Comedy Central and hosted The X Show on FX.

On the big screen, Valentine has appeared in Stuck on You and I Now Pronounce You Chuck and Larry. He also had a cameo in Jerry Seinfeld's documentary Comedian.

More recently, he makes occasional appearances as a roundtable comedian on the E! Network late-night talk show Chelsea Lately and also takes part in the Dusty Peacock web series on Crackle.

Valentine performs comedy tours in clubs across the country. He's been a frequent guest comedian on shows such as Comics Unleashed and the E! show Chelsea Lately.

He appeared in Paul Blart Mall Cop, Paul Blart: Mall Cop 2, and in the comedy web series Dusty Peacock on Crackle. Valentine also appeared as George Bannister in the movies The Dog Who Saved Christmas (2009), The Dog Who Saved Christmas Vacation (2010) and The Dog Who Saved Halloween (2011). He also played Maury in the 2009 comedy The Deported.

He co-hosted The X Show. Most recently, Valentine was executive producer of an upcoming new TV series, The Bachelor Chronicles.

From 2016-2018, Valentine co-starred in the CBS sitcom Kevin Can Wait.

List of Gary Valentine Movies

Filmography

References

External links

1961 births
Living people
American male film actors
American male television actors
Male actors from New York City
People from Stony Brook, New York
Ward Melville High School alumni
People from Mineola, New York
21st-century American male actors
20th-century American male actors
American people of German descent
American male comedians
Comedians from New York (state)
20th-century American comedians
21st-century American comedians